Yoshinori Namiki (born 15 January 1963) is a Japanese weightlifter. He competed in the men's flyweight event at the 1988 Summer Olympics.

References

1963 births
Living people
Japanese male weightlifters
Olympic weightlifters of Japan
Weightlifters at the 1988 Summer Olympics
Place of birth missing (living people)